Sviatoshyn (also  or ) is a historical neighborhood and a suburb of Ukraine's capital Kyiv that is located on the western edge of the city area, in an eponymous municipality.

Previously it was a dacha village (summer colony) in a pine grove which was included into the Kyiv city council area in 1919.

Location 

The neighbourhood is located in the North-East of the Dnieper Upland, in the western a part of Kyiv city's area.

The suburb is situated on both sides of Kyiv's prospect Peremohy along its western part. Sviatoshyn neighborhood borders the Nyvka River (Borshchahivka River) in the west, that flows through  there and falls into the Irpin River of the Dnieper basin. There is the  beginning on the opposite side of the Nyvka River.

The east boundary of the suburb is the Kyiv - Kovel railway.

All Sviatoshyn's adjacent neighbourhoods and suburbs belong to the Sviatoshyn Raion as well, except the village of Petropavlivska Borshchahivka. That village is in Bucha Raion (municipality) of Kyiv Oblast (region).

By roads, the suburb is located:
 13 km to the Kyiv city centre.
 10 km to the city's central station - Kyiv-Pasazhyrskyi Railway Station.
 12 km to Kyiv International Airport (Zhuliany)
 44 km to the main city's airport, Boryspil International Airport

The core Sviatoshyn road Peremohy Avenue is a part of European route E40, which is the main highway from Kyiv to the most European countries. There is  going through the suburb from north to south. It includes  and  there.

Name 

There are two hypotheses of the name of Sviatoshyn existing.

The first one comes from a version that there was a Saint Grove (Sviatyi, Святий гай) in there. That was a sacred place for pagans.

The second version says that the name is derived from the nickname of the Prince of Chernigov , who lived in the 12th century. His original name was Sviatoslav and he was a son of Davyd Sviatoslavich and a grandson of the Grand Prince of Kyiv Sviatoslav II. It is alleged that he owned a land at neighbouring Borshchahivka village. In 1106 the prince Sviatoslav donated all his property to the Kyiv Pechersk Lavra and became a monk of it. He took the monk Christian name Nikola (Nikolai). Since he had the born name Sviatoslav and was very devout he was given the informal nickname Sviatosha. Sviatosha means a pious, godly religious person.

In itself the Ukrainian word "Sviatoshyn" means "Sviatosha's", that is, something that belongs to Sviatosha.

Name's spellings 

In contrast to English speaking countries, the names of a city's suburbs in Ukraine, that belong to city councils areas, do not have so strict spelling rules, because their name do not play any significant roles in an official city's division to local municipalities (raions) or in the postal system.

The ethnographer  in his work "" in 1884 mentioned this place as "a woodland called Sviatoshyn". There is a document "The report of the Committee to facilitate accomplishment of the villa area in the locality Sviatoshyn of the Kyiv province and district. Kyiv, 1903" existing. At the beginning of the 20th century the dacha village was called Sviatoshyn (Святошинъ - in the ).

In the Soviet era there was a trend to change names of settlements, especially small ones, by putting the suffix "-o". So that since the 1930s on all maps of Kyiv, both Russian and Ukrainian languages, the suburb was marked as Sviatoshyno (Святошино). Settlement names with the suffix "-o" are more typical of Russian language than Ukrainian, so sometimes the name Sviatoshyne (Святошине) was used in Ukrainian spelling. Despite of that there is Sviatoshyn (Святошин) article included in  that was published by the Ukrainian Soviet Encyclopedia editorial office.

Since the station of the Kyiv Metro, which is the suburb's landmark,  was renamed Sviatoshyn (Святошин) station, this variant of suburb spelling has been started broadly used. Ukrainian linguists insist on using Sviatoshyn (Святошин) as the locality name. In spite of this, sometimes the name Sviatoshyno (Святошино) has still been used, even in official documents of the Kyiv City Council.

History

Early time 

Before the Kievan Rus epoch it was a territory of Eastern Polans and approximately 10 kilometres to the west, on the left bank of the Irpin River  Drevlians' land began.

At the time of Kievan Rus and  the Grand Duchy of Lithuania the land belonged to the Principality of Kyiv.

It is alleged that in the 12th century the owner of this land was the Prince of Chernigov  (Sviatoslav), who donated it to the Kyiv Pechersk Lavra. Until the beginning of the 17th century this area belonged to Kyiv monasteries.

The first mention of the area name Sviatoshyn was in 1619, when this land was a part of the Kyiv Voivodeship of the Crown of the Kingdom of Poland of the Polish–Lithuanian Commonwealth after the Union of Lublin. At that time the king Sigismund III Vasa determined the metes and bounds of Kyiv's burgesses land possession in his charter. In particular it was said that Kyiv's citizens boundary went "through an oak grove to Sviatoshyn side".

In the 1780s, at the time when this land was included into the Kyiv Viceroyalty of the Russian Empire, the Magdeburg rights of Kyiv were revoked so Sviatoshyn area went to the state ownership.

Until the end of the 19th century, that land had been mentioned like Sviatoshyn wood, grove or forest, and it was a part of the  volost of the Kyiv Governorate. There were no allusions about any permanent human settlements in there at that time.

Dacha village 
In 1897 the Sviatoshyn land, which had been occupied by a pine grove, was divided into 450 lots and leased for 99 years. Thus а dacha village (summer colony) was set up there.

A grid plan was implemented in the village. That area master plan is typical of dacha summer settlements. The core road of Sviatoshyn was Brest-Litovsky highway, now , that went from east to west dividing the village into two unequal parts.

 A prosika means a narrow straight glade in a forest, in which trees have been cut down for further road laying or other business purposes.

A lot of powerful, influential and rich people had villas there. In particular, villa owners were Kyiv University professors, three Kyiv mayors, businessmen including members of the "sugar magnate" Tereshchenko family.
 
The popularity of the villa area was growing up because of a pine grove, a pond and a good transport infrastructure. Simultaneously with developing the land area, in 1898 a narrow-gauge railway was laid from Kyiv and it was used as a horsecar tram line then steam tram-cars operated there. In 1901 the village was connected to an electricity network so on 1 May that year electric trams were launched.

In 1911 one of the oldest Kyiv's cinemas  (screen) was opened at the corner of Brest-Litovsky Highway and the 3rd Prosika.

Between the village and  suburb was Sviatoshyn Airfield where the pilot Pyotr Nesterov introduced his famous aerobatics flights.

In 1919 the village was included into the Kyiv City Council area.

Gallery

Soviet era 

As a result of the Ukrainian–Soviet War (1917–1921) and the Polish–Soviet War (1919–1921) Kyiv City and its suburbs was finally captured by the Red Army. In 1921 Bolsheviks conducted the administrative subdivision reform, so Kyiv was divided into 5 raions (districts) and Sviatoshyn was included into the City Council area permanently.

The Bolshevik government was conducting the nationalisation policy so that many dacha villas were expropriated. The best villas were transferred to state and trade unions sanatoriums, boarding schools and Young Pioneer camps. Some other villas and cottages were converted to communal apartments. In practice it means that a house owner family was left just one bedroom, a rest of bedrooms were given to other families, which usually originated from the working class. A kitchen room and a bathroom were used by all families together, that lived in a house.

In the 1930s Sviatoshyn's St. Nicholas Eastern Orthodox church was demolished by Bolsheviks. However, on the south-west edge of Sviatoshyn the Roman Catholic parish of the Exaltation of the Holy Cross was existing during the whole time of the Communist rule. It was only one the refuge for Roman Catholics in all Kyiv region.

In 1941 during the Second World War, the general staff of the Kyiv Fortified Region was situated in place of present Kyiv secondary school No. 140. and next to it, the operational team of the command post of the Southwestern Front was located at the modern address 80 Verkhovynna Street. In 1944-1945 the training centre of Soviet partisans (guerrillas) located in the house at 10 the 2nd Prosika.

At the end of the 1940s Sviatoshyn Airfield was passed to ownership of an aircraft serial production plant that since 1952 has been headquarters of Antonov state company. In 1988 the company produced the largest ever aircraft Antonov An-225 Mriya. Together with the aircraft factory development the new village  began being built next to the north-east edge of Sviatoshyn. The name Aviamistechko means "aviation town". Sometimes this locality has been called Novosviatoshyn (New Sviatoshyn) as well.

In 1947 the clothing factory "Kashtan" was launched; it was one of the biggest producer of men's shirts in the USSR.

Late in the 1950s the new housing estate  was started building on the land of the former vegetable farm "Sviatoshyn", that had been located north of the neighbourhood. Besides residential buildings there have been numerous research institutes of Ukrainian Academy of Sciences situated in there. Therefore, the suburb got the name Akademmistechko, which means "academic town".

In 1971 Sviatoshyn(o) station of the Kyiv Metro was opened on the east edge of neighbourhood, next to the same name railway station.

At the beginning of the 1970s a new housing estate of tower blocks was begun erecting in the north-west part of Sviatoshyn and south-east part of  suburbs, for that all existing former dacha houses had been demolished in there.

In 1982 due to increasing number of traffic lanes of Brest-Litovsky Highway, Sviatoshyn tram line was dismantled. Instead of trams, trolleybuses were launched to the neighbourhood.

Memorial to Chernobyl disaster victims 

The memorial is devoted to people who were killed, injured and suffered because of the Chernobyl disaster in 1986.

The monument to victims of that tragedy was erected at the initiative of the "Chernobyl Disabled Union" on 26 April 1994, with funds of the local budget and private donations. Authors of the monument are the sculptor  and architect .

In 2001 the St  church and in 2002 the bell tower museum were built at the monument.

In 2011 the memorial avenue "Heroes of Chernobyl" was created at the initiative of "Chernobyl Fire-fighters" NGO. There were erected seven busts of firemen, heroes of Ukraine and the Soviet Union and installed eight memorial plates in memory of died Chernobyl disaster liquidators.

Vasyl Stus Garden Square 

It is named after the poet and political prisoner Vasyl Stus, who was one of the most significant members of the Ukrainian cultural movement of the sixtiers. He was living near this place at 62 , since his marriage in 1965 to the first arrest in 1972. The house was demolished in 1979 due to building the road interchange there.

In 2006 at the initiative of the Ukrainian People's Party and  NGO, a local community meeting was conducted, it was decided to establish Vasyl Stus garden square. The initiative coordinator was Viktor Tkachenko. In March 2007 the Kyiv City Council supported this initiative and local volunteers including students of schools 140 and 200, clean up the plot on Earth Day. However, in 2008 the Kyiv City State Administration gave a building permit for shopping centre construction here. Thus the building developer cut down more than 100 trees including oaks older than 120 years and pines older than 150 years. The litigations began between parties.

Finally in 2010 the Kyiv City Council assigned "Vasyl Stus" name to this plot but in fact the garden square was opened on Kyiv Day of 2015 by the mayor of Kyiv Vitali Klitschko. There were Vasyl Stus's widow and his sister, who was a refugee from the Donetsk Oblast because of the Russo-Ukrainian War, granddaughter, friends-sixtiers, public activists and local community residents present in the ceremonial unveiling of the garden square.

Transport 

 is a point which all electric multiple unit trains go through from Kyiv towards the North-West direction. Some passenger trains that run to Western Ukraine stop at Sviatoshyn station.

There is the bus station "Dachna" located at 142a Peremohy Avenue. Buses to European countries and Western Ukraine set off from here.

The Sviatoshynsko-Brovarska Line of the Kyiv Metro is laid underground in the neighbourhood. Zhytomyrska Metro station, opened on 24 May 2003, is situated in the centre of Sviatoshyn. Sviatoshyn station, built in 1971, is on the eastern edge of the suburb. Akademmistechko station, opened in 2003, is located at the border Bilychi and Akademmistechko neighbourhoods near the north side of Sviatoshyn.

The suburb is connected to other neighbourhoods by Kyiv's municipal  and trolleybuses.

There is an airfield Sviatoshyn Airfield where is located Antonov Serial Production Plant, formerly Aviant.

External links 
 Information about the area - The local government of Sviatoshyn Rayon //
 Some photos of old Sviatoshyn cottages //

See also 
 Subdivisions of Kyiv

References 

Neighborhoods in Kyiv
Prospect Beresteiskyi
Sviatoshynskyi District